Bracebridge Heath is a village and civil parish located approximately  south of the city of Lincoln, in Lincolnshire, England. It lies at the junction of two major roads the A15 to Sleaford and the A607 to Grantham, and was (until modern systems of local government were introduced in the 19th century) part of the Boothby Graffoe Wapentake. The village sits on top of Lincoln Cliff, overlooking Lincoln and the valley of the River Witham. The population of the civil parish at the 2001 census was 4,530, increasing to 5,656 at the 2011 census.

History 

Until 1898 Bracebridge Heath was part of the parish of Bracebridge. Bracebridge may have had its origins in the Old English braesc + brycg, meaning 'bridge or causeway made of branches'. The River Witham runs  to the west, lending some credibility to this theory.

The village is mentioned in the Domesday Book as "Brachebrige". Before the Norman Conquest lordship was held by Ulf Fenman, and after by Bishop Geoffrey of Coutances, who also became Tenant-in-chief.

The central road junction in Bracebridge Heath is the junction of three Roman roads, now the A15 (the Sleaford Road), the A607 (the Grantham Road), and Cross O'Cliffe Hill into Lincoln. The line of Ermine Street, when extended from its last traceable part at Harmston, south of Bracebridge Heath, runs north through Waddington to Heath Road in Bracebridge Heath. Heath Road continues the line of Ermine Street.

In 1876, 340 persons were recorded as living in the parish, the most notable of which included:

Thomas Allen, MD (at the Asylum)
William Andrew, Solicitor
Rev. William Bromehead BA, Vicar
William Coupland, Blacksmith and Beerhouse
William Green, Blacksmith
George Kirkup, Asylum Steward
William Mills, Wards Brickyard
Edward Palmer, MD, Asylum Superintendent
George Wheatley, Carpenter
Charles White, Pattern and Clog Maker
John Wollfit, Licensed Victualler, at The John Bull
Thomas Butler, Farmer
Charles Clarke, Farmer
Edwin Scrivener, Farmer
William Toulson, Farmer
Mrs Mary Winn, Post and Carrier from Lincoln
Harry Webber, Hall Farm hand

Modern Bracebridge Heath 
Bracebridge Heath has changed considerably since White's description of 1876. The village boundary is now much extended northwards in the direction of Lincoln and south towards the nearby village of Waddington.

The parish of Bracebridge Heath was created out of the complete parish of Bracebridge by a Local Government Order (Kesteven) on 1 April 1898. To date, it has remained basically as it was created apart from one minor boundary adjustment.

A local landmark is the finely worked stone water pumping station and reservoir located on Grantham Road, known locally as 'The Water Tower', as opposed to the white 'Hospital water tower', a header tank for the hospital laundry boilers another prominent landmark, now demolished in 2014.

This 'new'(1912) subterranean reservoir, of which only the 'pumping machinery tower' can be seen, was an overflow for the main reservoir in Westgate Water Tower, and replaced an 'old' open reservoir on Bracebridge Heath on London Road, built in 1871 and closed in 1925. It had been left water-filled from 1912 as an emergency supply in case of fire at the Asylum until the new 'Hospital' water tower was erected and connected to the mains in 1925, from whence it lay empty, and decaying until 1972 when it was filled in and built on, today it is known as Stanley Crescent.
The 'new' water reservoir was expanded in the early 1970s

The Lincoln Typhoid outbreak of 1904/5, was caused mainly by surface water run-off into the River Witham from the Asylum Farm fields on the hill slope behind Bracebridge, where untreated effluent was run from the Asylum down a tunnel behind houses on Canwick Avenue into a brick channel at the top of the fields, which just overflowed to fertilise them by irrigation.

In 1912 the 30 houses of the village, and the Asylum, which had been served by deep wells were connected to the mains, and all the wells in use on the Heath were condemned and closed.

Buildings
Other than the old mental hospital chapel (now private accommodation), there is St John's Church (Church of England) on Grantham Road and the Methodist Church, on almost the opposite side of the road. St John's primary school, (now an Academy School) formerly Bracebridge Heath County Primary School,(1880) is situated on the same road along with a small row of shops, and opposite, a new shopping centre.

Just off Sleaford Road (A15) in the direction of Lincoln is the village hall almost behind 'The Bull' Public House (formerly the 'John Bull' public house). Earlier the church hall, situated behind St John's Church, served in that capacity, until the current village hall was built in the 1970s. The Church Hall was taken over by the local Scout group (21st Lincoln) in the early 1980s. They had used it as their headquarters. A local benefactor purchased the hall and donated it to the group.

There was a police station on Whitehall Crescent, which was (in June 2012) enlarged and refurbished, it later underwent further work and is now a Nursery. Next to the Nursery is a public library. Also on London Road is a Medical Centre and GP's Surgery.

A 1921 war memorial and Remembrance garden is situated on the eastern side of the junction of the Sleaford, London, and Grantham Roads.

St John's Hospital

St John's Hospital closed in December 1989 and the site has been sold to a property developer who has built 183 luxury homes and apartments there. The original hospital buildings are classified as Grade II listed buildings.

Further enlargement

Building work has continued with the construction of a housing development on Grantham Road on the site of the old 'Texaco' petrol station. Almost opposite is the old Pegasus service station (now derelict for some years), which is now used as a car wash, houses have also been constructed within this area.

Public houses
Modern Bracebridge Heath has three public houses.
'The Blacksmiths Arms' now shortened to 'The Blacksmiths', on the site of the Victorian blacksmith's shop and beerhouse built, opened and run by the family of William Green, a Harmston farmer, in 1852. It stands at the point where London Road divides into the Sleaford Road (A15) and the Grantham Road (A607). It has recently been refurbished and re-opened after standing derelict for some years.   Directly opposite this on the western side of Grantham Road is the 'John Bull' since 2007 renamed 'The Bull'. Its first spirit license was granted to Thomas Spain, 16 October 1849.   'The Homestead' public house is a late-1990s building conversion of one of the former hospital buildings, which served originally as the hospital Superintendent's residence.  (Built in 1906 for Dr. Thomas Leonard Johnston). 

There was one other, now long closed, opened to serve the large Irish labour force building the Lincolnshire County Pauper Lunatic Asylum.   The old pub still stands, its face basically unaltered, but divided into two houses, in a row of stone cottages, south of the junction with the A607 on the A15 Sleaford Road.   Bought out of the Red Hall Estate, on 3 December 1849 from the Chartist land agent Thomas Allsop, it was built and opened in early 1850 by Andrew Binns, a builder turned publican, and was named the 'Mason's Arms'.    With the opening of the 'John Bull' in 1849, it may be assumed trade had always been somewhat speculative. The 'Mason's Arms' was put up for sale on 3 August 1850, with its 2 acres of land, finally closing as public house in 1859, it became thereafter fully residential.

Facilities
The village is home to the headquarters of the local Area Health Authority. It is based around the home of one of the Newsum family, (formerly Wood Merchants). Arthur Crookes Newsum J.P., built 'Cross O'Cliffe Court' in 1908/9.

A local cricket club, Bracebridge Heath Cricket Club, has its grounds within the spacious wooded grounds.

Bracebridge Heath is served with amenities which include a police station, a public library, a primary school, a doctor's practice, public houses, fish and chip shop, Tesco Express, a co-op with a post office, a pharmacy, a funeral director, Chinese, Indian, and Pizza take-aways, hairdressers, cafe, taxi, a sports and social club, a bed and breakfast, two churches with church halls, and a village hall. There is also a village sports field with a hall, skateboard facility, bowling, tennis, and football areas.

There is a bus service through the village and the other 'Cliff' villages with rail connections at each end, a 24-hour petrol station and shop on the A15 Sleaford Road, in the South of the village.

To the west of London road (A15), is an area of open land which was known locally as 'The Hillies'. Although privately owned (by the Church), it served for many years as unofficial common land, used for sheep grazing, dog walking and for a rough and ready village football pitch. A public footpath which forms part of The Viking Way runs through it. For several years it has been given over to crop growing.

Viking Way

RAF Bracebridge Heath
A Royal Flying Corps (RFC) aerodrome at Bracebridge Heath originally opened in 1916 for use by the Robey-Peters aircraft factory, in the manufacture and flight testing of their own designs and licence-built Sopwith aircraft. . RAF Bracebridge Heath enlarged circa 1919–1920, housed No. 121 Squadron RAF and No. 4 Aircraft Acceptance Park RAF.

In the Second World War, an aircraft repair organisation at Bracebridge Heath, managed by A V Roe and Co Ltd, recovered 'battle damaged' Avro Lancaster bomber parts, which would otherwise have been scrapped, returning them to service and making a contribution to the bomber offensive against Nazi Germany. An MAP B.1 type aircraft hangar from this period survived in 2014.

There was a Grade II listed triple-bay Belfast truss aircraft hangar here (built c1917), but this was demolished on safety grounds in 2001. Two other modified and re-clad single-bay Belfast truss hangars survived.

References

Walls, John & Parker, Charles (2000) ‘Aircraft Made in Lincoln’ (The Society for Lincolnshire History and Archaeology).

External links
 
 "Bracebridge Heath", Official Website of Bracebridge Heath Parish Council. Retrieved 3 February 2017
 "Bracebridge", Genuki.org.uk. Retrieved 24 December 2011
 "Bracebridge Asylum", Genuki.org.uk. Retrieved 24 December 2011
 

Villages in Lincolnshire
Civil parishes in Lincolnshire
North Kesteven District